Mad About Town is the second album by new wave group Slow Children, released in 1982. It contained the singles "President Am I" and "Vanessa Vacillating".

Track listing
 "One More Trauma"
 "Late Night Transatlantic"
 "Unplugging the Vacuum"
 "Vanessa Vacillating"
 "Suspense"
 "President Am I (Extended Version)"
 "Respective Sides"
 "Skill of a Caveman"
 "Missing Missiles"
 "East Berlin by Rail"

References

External links
 Official Slow Children website

1982 albums
Albums produced by Stephen Hague
Slow Children albums